Alain Ehrenberg is a French sociologist.

Author of a PhD thesis of sociology Archangels, warriors, military men and sportsmen. Essay on the education of the strong man in 1978, he subsequently became interested in the anxieties of the individual in modern society, faced with the need for achievement and autonomy and the loss of social signposts and support systems.

After being a researcher at the Edgar Morin Centre at the School for Advanced Studies in the Social Sciences in Paris, Ehrenberg founded and co-directed the research group "Psychotropics, Politics, Society" (Centre de recherche Psychotropes, Santé mentale, Société, aka Cesames). This is a joint research unit of the Centre national de la recherche scientifique (CNRS - National Centre for Scientific Research) and the University of Paris 5 (René Descartes). 

 Ehrenberg is a director of research at the CNRS and of Cesames.

Works 
 (in collaboration with Jean-Pierre and Patrick Zylberman Yahi) Archangels, warriors, sportsmen and small perverse genesis of competitive sports and fate of physical violence: Policy Analysis of the promoters of the French and Japanese karate, implantation to the institution, 1953-1976, Organizing Committee for applied research on economic and social development, 1977–1980
The Military Corps: Politics and Pedagogy in a Democracy, Aubier-Montaigne, 1983
The Cult of Achievement, Calmann-Lévy, Paris, 1991
The Uncertain Individual, Calmann-Lévy, Paris, 1995
The Fatigue of being oneself - Depression and society, Odile Jacob, Paris 1998 (reprint pockets Odile Jacob) 
The Uneasy Society, Odile Jacob, Paris, 2010

Bibliography 
 PhD thesis supervised by Eugene Henriquez, submitted 1978 at the Paris University X
 "Depression, illness of autonomy," Ehrenberg interviewed by Michel Botbol in Nervure XVI-3, September 2003

Filmography 
Nervousness in civilization. From the cult of performance to psychic collapse, Conference Alain Ehrenberg, University of all knowledges, SFRS, Vanves, 2001, 76 '(DVD)

Further reading

External links
 Cesames

References 

French sociologists
1950 births
Writers from Paris
Living people
French male writers
Research directors of the French National Centre for Scientific Research